Asher Benjamin (June 15, 1773July 26, 1845) was an American architect and author whose work transitioned between Federal architecture and the later Greek Revival architecture. His seven handbooks on design deeply influenced the look of cities and towns throughout New England until the Civil War. Builders also copied his plans in the Midwest and in the South.

Life and work
Asher Benjamin was born in rural Hartland, Connecticut, shortly before the death of his father. He resided until the age of 30 in the Connecticut River Valley, where he received his first training from a local builder. Benjamin exhibited an aptitude for architecture by carving Ionic capitals for the 1794 modifications to the Oliver Phelps House at Suffield, Connecticut. In 1795-1796 he designed and built a stone spiral staircase in the Old State House at Hartford, which had been designed by Charles Bulfinch. The latter's use of overall symmetry, blind arches, fanlights and smooth brick greatly influenced Benjamin, who popularized the urbane Federal style in countryside estates. Gideon Granger wrote of Benjamin:

"From a poor boy unaided by friends, by his indefatigable industry and talents in a few years he has raised himself to the first rank of his profession."

Upon leaving Connecticut, Benjamin settled in Greenfield, Massachusetts. There he built two large houses, including the Leavitt House (today's Leavitt-Hovey House) for Judge Jonathan Leavitt, and published his first handbook, The Country Builder's Assistant (1797). On November 30, 1797, he married Achsah Hitchcock of Brookfield, with whom he had four children. Benjamin relocated to Windsor, Vermont, where he built three large houses and the Old South Congregational Church (1798).

By 1803, Benjamin was living in Boston, listed in the city directory as a housewright. He designed numerous churches and houses, and also appears to have conducted the country's first architecture school. Robert Henry Eddy, Elias Carter, Solomon Willard, Samuel Shepherd and Ithiel Town are credited among his pupils. After his first wife died on January 30, 1805, on July 24 he married Nancy Bryant of Springfield, whom he had four more children with.

In 1823 and 1824, Benjamin was elected alderman of Boston as part of the "Middling Interest": a coalition of middle class entrepreneurs and artisans opposed to the Federalists, who supported Josiah Quincy for mayor. He assisted Mayor Quincy and Alexander Parris in the planning of Quincy Market. Finding himself under a financial strain that led him to declare bankruptcy in 1825, Benjamin's political ambitions were soon curtailed. From 1825 to 1827 he left Boston to supervise construction of locks, canals, roads and mill buildings for the Nashua Manufacturing Company in Nashua, New Hampshire. He designed two churches there before returning to Boston.

Benjamin's greatest influence is derived from his pattern books. The first written by an American architect, they introduced architectural history, style and geometry to ordinary builders in the field. He adapted many designs by James Gibbs and Colen Campbell of Great Britain to fit the scale and finances of New England communities. These handbooks provided superb drawings and practical advice for full house plans, including such details as circular staircases, doorways, fireplace mantels, dormer windows, pilasters, balusters and fences. He sketched proposals for dwellings and churches, even a courthouse. The archeological sources of his designs were scrupulously cited, from the Temple of Hephaestus in Athens to the Arch of Titus in Rome. Other architects, including Ithiel Town and Ammi B. Young, freely assimilated his plans, as did innumerable carpenters. Indeed, the charm of many early New England towns owes a debt to Asher Benjamin. The Ridge in Orford, New Hampshire features a series of houses based on designs from his books, many of which remain in print. Although he helped disseminate the Federal style, he was not averse to changing fashions. In fact, his book published in 1830, The Architect, or, Practical House Carpenter, helped redirect American taste towards the Greek Revival movement.

Architectural historian Talbot Hamlin writes:

"...he, more than any other person, is responsible for the character we roughly call 'Late Colonial'; his moldings, his doors and windows and his mantels and cornices decorate or at least inspire the decorations of numberless houses up and down the New England coast and in the New England river valleys."

Asher Benjamin died in Springfield  the age of 72.

Books

 The Country Builder's Assistant, 1797
 The American Builder's Companion, with Daniel Raynerd, 1806. 3rd ed., 1816.
 The Rudiments of Architecture, 1814
 The Architect, or, Practical House Carpenter, 1830
 The Practice of Architecture, 1833
 The Builder's Guide, 1838
 The Elements of Architecture, 1843

Designs

 1796—Luke Baldwin House, Brookfield, Massachusetts (demolished)
 1796—Samuel Hinckley House, Northampton, Massachusetts (demolished)
 1796-1797—Coleman-Hollister House, Greenfield, Massachusetts
 1797 -- Leavitt-Hovey House (now Greenfield Public Library), Greenfield, Massachusetts
 1797-1798—First Deerfield Academy Building (now Memorial Hall), Deerfield, Massachusetts
 1798-1799—Stebbins House, Deerfield, Massachusetts
 1798—Old South Congregational Church, Windsor, Vermont
 1800—Fullerton House, Windsor, Vermont (demolished)
 1802—Harriet Lane House, Windsor, Vermont (demolished)
 1803—Hubbard House, Windsor, Vermont (demolished)
 1804 -- Charles Street Meeting House, 70 Charles Street, Boston, Massachusetts
 1806 -- Old West Church, 131 Cambridge Street, Boston, Massachusetts
 1806 -- African Meeting House, 8 Smith Court, Boston, Massachusetts
 1807 -- Sumner Mansion, Hartland, Vermont
 1808 -- Headquarters House, 54-55 Beacon Street, Boston, Massachusetts
 1808—60 or 61 Beacon Street, Boston, Massachusetts
 1808—Fourth Meeting House of the First Church, Chauncy Street, Boston, Massachusetts
 1809—First Parish Church, Ashby, Massachusetts
 1809 -- Exchange Coffee House, Boston
 1811—Alexander House, Springfield, Massachusetts
 1811-1812—Fourth Meeting House, Northampton, Massachusetts (demolished)
 1812-1814—Center Church, New Haven, Connecticut (with Ithiel Town)
 1817—Rhode Island Union Bank, Newport, Rhode Island (demolished)
 1818—Bulfinch Hall (originally called Brick Academy), Phillips Academy, Andover, Massachusetts
 1819—Boylston Villa, Princeton, Massachusetts (For Ward Nicholas Boylston)
 1820—Ransom Stiles House, Argyle, New York
 1824-1827—The Black House, Ellsworth, Maine
 1825—Unitarian Church, Peterborough, New Hampshire
 1826-1832 -- Asa Waters Mansion, Millbury, Massachusetts
 1827—Unitarian Church, Canal Street, Nashua, New Hampshire
 1827—Olive Street Church, Nashua, New Hampshire (demolished)
 1828—70-75 Beacon Street, Boston, Massachusetts
 1830—Isaac Munson House, South Wallingford, Vermont (demolished)
 1832—Cambridgeport Town Hall, Cambridgeport, Massachusetts (demolished)
 1833—Asher Benjamin House, 9 West Cedar Street, Boston, Massachusetts
 1833—7 West Cedar Street, Boston, Massachusetts
 1834 -- Thatcher Magoun Mansion, Medford, Massachusetts (demolished)
 1835—Lexington-Concord Battle Monument, Peabody, Massachusetts
 1836—Dr. George Shattuck Monument, Mount Auburn Cemetery, Massachusetts
 1836—William Ellery Channing House, 83 Mount Vernon Street, Boston, Massachusetts
 1836 -- Forest Home, the F. O. J. Smith House, Westbrook, Maine (demolished)
 1837—Proposal for the Custom House, Boston, Massachusetts (competition lost to Ammi B. Young)
 1838-1839—Fifth Universalist Church (now the Charles Playhouse), 74 Warrenton Street, Boston, Massachusetts
 1840—Richmond Street Church, Dorchester, Massachusetts (demolished)
 1841—Edmund Hastings House, Medford, Massachusetts (demolished)

Gallery of designs

Further reading
 The American Builder's Companion; Or, A System of Architecture, Particularly Adapted to the Present Style of Building, Third Edition, Asher Benjamin, R. P. & C. Williams, Boston, Mass., 1816

References

 Mary Wallace Crocker, "Asher Benjamin: The Influence of His Handbooks on Mississippi Buildings," The Journal of the Society of Architectural Historians, Vol. 38, No. 3 (October, 1979); pp. 266–270
 Juliette Tomlinson, "Asher Benjamin -- Connecticut Architect," Connecticut Antiquarian 6 (1954)

External links

 Charles Street Meeting House (1804)
 Coleman-Hollister House (1796-1797)
 Samuel Hinckley House (1796)
 History of the Stiles House (c. 1820)

1773 births
1845 deaths
People from Hartland, Connecticut
People from Greenfield, Massachusetts
Architects from Boston
People of colonial Connecticut
Greek Revival architects
Federalist architects
Architects from Connecticut
18th-century American architects
19th-century American architects